Darya Siarheyeuna Naumava (born 26 August 1995) is a Belarusian weightlifter and European Champion. She won silver medals at the 2014 Junior World Championships and 2016 Summer Olympics.

She represented Belarus at the 2020 Summer Olympics in Tokyo, Japan. She competed in the women's 76 kg event.

Naumava has two sisters. All sisters are teachers by profession. They grew up in a peasant family, and the eldest, Polina, trained in kettlebell lifting. Darya first took up shot put and discus throw, but around the age of 16 changed to weightlifting, which fitted better to her relatively short stature (1.65 m).

Major results

References

External links

 

1995 births
Living people
Belarusian female weightlifters
Weightlifters at the 2016 Summer Olympics
Olympic weightlifters of Belarus
People from Klichaw District
Olympic silver medalists for Belarus
Olympic medalists in weightlifting
Medalists at the 2016 Summer Olympics
Universiade medalists in weightlifting
World Weightlifting Championships medalists
Mogilev State A. Kuleshov University alumni
Universiade silver medalists for Belarus
European Weightlifting Championships medalists
Weightlifters at the 2020 Summer Olympics
Sportspeople from Mogilev Region